Uxul is an ancient Maya settlement in the Campeche region of Mexico. It was at the pinnacle of its existence in the classical period (circa 250 to 900 A.D.), and was located in a densely populated area between the larger Maya cities of El Mirador to the south and Calakmul to the northeast. Uxul is a Mayan term meaning “at the end”, signifying its remoteness, however this was not the original name for the settlement, but a name coined by the two men who rediscovered it in 1934, Karl Ruppert and John H. Denison.

Historical Importance

Uxul had trade connections that stretched as far south as modern-day Guatemala and to the Central Mexican Plateau. According to inscriptions, at approximately 630 A.D. Uxul was annexed under the rule of Calakmul, which was situated 26 kilometres away.

Archaeological Discoveries

Archaeological operations have been conducted on Uxul since 2009 and this is primarily being managed by the University of Bonn in Germany and independent Mexican researchers. 

Digging was first concentrated on uncovering and mapping the old walls of the city, which led to the discovery of two very large water reservoirs, known as aguadas. These aguadas were particularly remarkable in that the bottoms were sealed intricately with ceramics, which would have been an epic undertaking of work for those involved, given that the pools are each as large as ten Olympic-sized swimming pools.

The researchers at the site had expressed a worry that any tombs potentially located at the site might have been already raided by grave robbers searching for jewellery or ceramics. These fears were alleviated during an extraordinary find in August 2012; excavating a palace in the ruined city, archaeologists uncovered the ancient tomb of a young prince, alongside a rare artefact. A concealed entrance to a small burial chamber was found in the royal palace, leading to the remains of a 25-year-old man and nine ceramic objects. On one of the cups found, it contained a simple message saying, “[This is] the cup of the young man/prince”. Another of the cups bore a date thought to be 711 A.D., giving some indication of when the monarch was alive.

A mass grave of prisoners of war, or nobles from Uxul itself, decapitated and dismembered around 1,400 years ago, was discovered in an artificial cave in Uxul, reported in 2913.

See also
K'àak' Chi'

References

External links
 Digital reconstruction of Uxul

Archaeological sites in Mexico